Georg Sorensen (born 15 May 1995) is a Danish professional ice hockey goaltender. He is currently playing with the Aalborg Pirates of the Metal Ligaen.

Sorensen competed with Denmark men's national ice hockey team at the 2013, 2014, and 2015 World Junior Hockey Championships.  In 2013 he became only the second goalie to ever score a goal in an IIHF event.

References

External links
 

1995 births
Living people
Almtuna IS players
Danish ice hockey goaltenders
Frederikshavn White Hawks players
Herning Blue Fox players
Södertälje SK players